Dan Ashworth (born 6 March 1971) is an English football director. Currently he is working as sporting director for Premier League club Newcastle United, previously he worked as technical director for West Bromwich Albion and Brighton and Hove Albion, and was FA director of elite development.

Career
Ashworth studied at the College of West Anglia from 1987 to 1989. After time in the academy at Norwich City, Ashworth joined non-league club Eastbourne Town playing 21 games and scoring 4 goals before moving across to St. Leonards. Ashworth later spent time in the United States, coaching West Florida Fury, before returning to England to play for Wisbech Town. Ashworth left Wisbech in the autumn of 2000, following financial problems at the club.

Ashworth continued to be involved with football after retiring as a player, and was appointed academy director at Peterborough United in 2000. In 2001, he went on to become center of excellence director at Cambridge United until March 2004 when he moved to West Bromwich Albion assisting youth team manager Aidy Boothroyd. After Boothroyd's departure in the July of that year he took over as youth team manager until he was promoted to the club's sporting and technical director in December 2007.

On 17 September 2012, Ashworth was appointed as the FA director of elite development. He is one of the creators of the "England DNA", an elite player development plan which aims "to help create winning senior teams, in the men's and the women's game."

In August 2018, it was reported that Ashworth has been shortlisted by Manchester United as a candidate for the technical director.

In September 2018, it was announced that Ashworth had resigned his role with the FA, and would take up the post of Technical Director at Premier League club Brighton & Hove Albion in spring 2019.

In February 2022, it was confirmed that Ashworth had agreed to join Premier League club Newcastle United taking up the post of Sporting Director.

Honours
Individual
 Maurice Burlaz Trophy: 2017

References

External links
Career information at ex-canaries.co.uk

1971 births
Living people
English footballers
Norwich City F.C. players
Eastbourne Town F.C. players
St. Leonards F.C. players
Wisbech Town F.C. players
Association football coaches
English expatriate sportspeople in the United States
West Bromwich Albion F.C. non-playing staff
The Football Association
Place of birth missing (living people)
Association football defenders
Peterborough United F.C. non-playing staff
Cambridge United F.C. non-playing staff
Brighton & Hove Albion F.C. non-playing staff